David John Peterson (born September 3, 1995) is an American professional baseball pitcher for the New York Mets of Major League Baseball (MLB).

Early life and amateur career
Peterson's parents, Shannon and Doug, divorced when Peterson was a child. Peterson spent much of his childhood in stables with his father, a horse trainer who trained the likes of Seattle Slew. When Peterson was nine years old, his father died of an accidental drug overdose. Between eighth grade and his freshman year of high school, he grew ten inches.

Peterson attended Regis Jesuit High School in Aurora, Colorado. In 2013, he played in the Under Armour All-America Baseball Game at Wrigley Field. Before his senior year, he broke his fibula during a basketball game, underwent surgery and missed his entire senior baseball season. As a result, he fell to the 28th round of the 2014 MLB Draft. Peterson chose not to sign with the Boston Red Sox and instead enrolled at the University of Oregon, where he played college baseball for the Ducks.

Peterson started 14 games as a freshman at Oregon in 2015, going 4–6 with a 4.39 earned run average (ERA) and 81 strikeouts.  As a sophomore in 2016, he went 4–5 with a 3.63 ERA and 61 strikeouts over 13 starts. During the summer, he played for the United States national team. Peterson became Oregon's number one starter in 2017. On March 3, he set a school record with 17 strikeouts, breaking the previous record of 14 held by Tyler Anderson. On April 29, he broke his record after recording 20.

Professional career
Peterson was drafted by the New York Mets with the 20th pick in the first round of the 2017 MLB draft. He signed and was assigned to the Brooklyn Cyclones, where he spent the whole season, posting a 2.45 ERA in three games.

MLB.com ranked Peterson as New York's second best prospect going into the 2018 season. He began 2018 with the Columbia Fireflies and was promoted to the St. Lucie Mets in June. In 22 total starts between the two teams, he went 7–10 with a 3.16 ERA. He spent 2019 with the Binghamton Rumble Ponies, going 3–6 with a 4.19 ERA over 24 starts, striking out 122 batters over 116 innings.

Peterson had his contract selected to the 40-man roster on July 28, 2020. He made his major league debut on that same day, against the Boston Red Sox at Fenway Park, getting the win after pitching  innings, giving up two runs on seven hits and an error with two walks and three strikeouts in 78 pitches. After the start, Peterson described it as "one of the greatest days of" his life.

Peterson was placed on the 10-day injured list before his start against the Miami Marlins on August 18, 2020, due to left shoulder fatigue, an issue that had arisen following his outing against the Washington Nationals on August 13, 2020. He returned to the active roster two weeks later and finished the season 6–2 with a 3.44 ERA over 10 games (9 starts).

On July 2, 2021, Peterson was placed on the injured list with an oblique strain. On July 24, Peterson was transferred to the 60-day injured list.

References

External links

Oregon Ducks bio

1995 births
Living people
People from Arcadia, California
Baseball players from Colorado
Major League Baseball pitchers
New York Mets players
Oregon Ducks baseball players
All-American college baseball players
Brooklyn Cyclones players
Columbia Fireflies players
St. Lucie Mets players
Binghamton Rumble Ponies players
Scottsdale Scorpions players